The 1985 Humboldt State Lumberjacks football team represented Humboldt State University during the 1985 NCAA Division II football season. Humboldt State competed in the Northern California Athletic Conference in 1985.

The 1985 Lumberjacks were led by head coach Bud Van Deren in his 20th and last year at the helm. They played home games at the Redwood Bowl in Arcata, California. Humboldt State finished with a record of two wins and nine losses (2–8, 1–4 NCAC). The Lumberjacks were outscored by their opponents 175–350 for the season.

In 20 years under coach Van Deren, the Lumberjacks compiled a record of 98–101–4. They had nine winning seasons, and won the conference championship once (1968). That was the same year Humboldt State had its only bowl win, the 1968 Camellia Bowl.

Schedule

Notes

References

Humboldt State
Humboldt State Lumberjacks football seasons
Humboldt State Lumberjacks football